South Asia is considered to include seven regions/countries. The lists of butterflies found in each individual country are given on these pages:
 List of butterflies of India
 List of butterflies of Pakistan
 List of butterflies of Bangladesh
 List of butterflies of Bhutan
 List of butterflies of Sri Lanka
 List of butterflies of Nepal
 List of butterflies of the Maldives

External links
  List of butterflies of Nepal and the Himalaya

02
South Asia
.
South Asia
South Asia
South Asia